Arasiyal is an 1997 Indian Tamil language film directed by R. K. Selvamani. The film stars Mammootty, Shilpa Shirodkar and Roja. It was released on 12 December 1997.

Plot

Chandrasekhar (Mammootty) is an honest collector who arrests Vikram (Anandaraj), an international terrorist, in Delhi. He's transferred to Madras to eradicate the corruption. Chandrasekhar has two sisters, Priya (Jeeva) and Supriya (Roja). Priya is in love with Marudapandi (Charan Raj), a hopeless police officer and Chandrasekhar's friend. Meanwhile, Chandrasekhar is in love with Anita Sharma (Shilpa Shirodkar), a Punjabi girl, who he met in Delhi. Venkatraman (Mansoor Ali Khan), a corrupt politician, is suspected by Chandrasekhar for corruption. Chandrasekhar takes actions against his brothers-in-law, Vishnu (Madhan Bob) and Ramkumar (Uday Prakash) and sent them to jail. Chandrasekhar gets a job promotion because his superiors hate his honest work, but he resigned and showed the journalists the corruption proofs of all corrupted politicians. The people becomes angry and beats all corrupted politicians, and Venkatraman's politic party doesn't even win a seat at the parliament. Chandrasekhar gets married with his lover in Punjab. Venkatraman's wife Vasanthi (Pallavi) was sent to jail for corruption. Venkatraman loses all his money and decides to take vengeance. Vikram, released from jail, wants also to revenge Chandrasekhar and becomes friends with Venkatraman. When Vikram decides to kill Chandrasekhar, he sees his sister Anita Sharma and promised her to protect his husband. Venkatraman's henchmen kidnaps Priya; but when she escaped, she fell from the building and died. They also put a bomb in Supriya's handbag which exploded by killing Supriya and Marudapandi. Venkatraman kills Vikram but Chandrasekhar is suspected for Vikram's murder. Chandrasekhar escapes from the police and kills all corrupted politicians. Finally, Chandrasekhar gets applause for his actions, but the court sends him to jail.

Cast
Mammootty as Chandrasekhar
Shilpa Shirodkar as Anita Sharma
Roja as Supriya
Mansoor Ali Khan as Venkatraman (R. K. V)
Anandaraj as Vikram (guest appearance)
Charan Raj as Marudapandi
Jeeva as Priya
Jai Ganesh as Shanmugasundaram, Chandrasekhar's father
Sumithra as Chandrasekhar's mother
John Amirtharaj as the Chief Minister
Thyagu as Thiruvasagam
Madhan Bob as Vishnu
Uday Prakash as Ramkumar
Pallavi as Vasanthi

Production
After the success of Makkal Aatchi, the actor and director to join in another political film titled Arasiyal. The director, prior to release, played down any potential controversial story plots and indicated it would be more about a politician's personal life rather than his work. The team shot across North India in 1997 with scenes also filmed at the Harmandir Sahib, Punjab.

Soundtrack
The music was composed by Vidyasagar, with lyrics written by Vairamuthu, Vaasan, Arunmozhi and Piraisoodan. The film marked the debut of Harish Raghavendra in films.

Reception 
R. Vijayaraghavan of Indolink.com gave the film 2 stars writing, "Yet another attempt by R.K.Selvamani to cobble up a movie based on real-life political happenings. May be his bad luck, it turns out be a cliche." Despite the mixed reviews, Mammootty's performance was well noted by critics and fans.

The film was a commercial success, however, was an average grosser at the box office.

Awards 
The film has won the following awards since its release :

Tamil Nadu State Film Awards 1997 

Best Film Award (3rd Place)

References

External links

1997 films
1990s Tamil-language films
Indian political films
Films scored by Vidyasagar
Films shot in Punjab, India
Films directed by R. K. Selvamani